Kangeq or Kangek (Kalaallisut: "Promontory") is a former settlement in the Sermersooq municipality in southwestern Greenland. It is located on the same island that formed the first Danish-Norwegian colony on Greenland between 1721 and 1728.

History 

As a coastal settlement, Kangeq was positioned on the migration route of the ancient Inuit peoples. Archeological finds from the Dorset culture era have been found near Kangeq. The Dorset people had vanished from the Nuuk region prior to 1000 CE.

The island of Kangeq, dubbed Håbets Ø ("Island of Hope"), formed the site of Hans Egede's first settlement in Greenland after his landing on July 3, 1721. The settlement was relocated to the mainland by Major Claus Paarss in 1728.

In the mid-19th century, it was also home to the artist Aron of Kangeq (1822-1869), a Greenland Inuit hunter, painter, and oral historian. In 1854, Kangeq became an official trading station, and an official residence was built for the assistant representing the Royal Greenland Trade Department.

Today the ruins of Kangeq are sometimes visited by historically oriented tourists. In 2009, the old houses of Kangeq were used as a backdrop for the Eksperimentet film, with the settlement emulating the look of Nuuk in 1952.

Geography 

Former notable residents 
 Aron of Kangeq (1822-1869), painter and oral historian

References 

Former populated places in Greenland
Ghost towns in Greenland
Labrador Sea